Jonathan Thomas (born 27 December 1982, in Pembroke) is a Welsh rugby union coach and former player, he played mainly at flanker having also played at number eight and lock. He was previously head coach of Worcester Warriors. On January 17th 2023 he was appointed as an Assistant Coach of the Welsh rugby union team.

Early life
Thomas was an international cricketer playing for Wales u.15's

Career

Club
Thomas started out playing for Pembroke RFC juniors, before playing for Swansea RFC when they were still a professional club, captaining them at the age of 19.  With the regionalisation of Welsh rugby in 2003, Swansea combined with Neath to form the Ospreys, where over a 10-year period Thomas won four league titles and an Anglo-Welsh Cup. He is the youngest player to captain the Ospreys. At the time of leaving he was the joint highest appearance holder, together with Andrew Bishop on 188 appearances.

On 28 May 2013, Thomas joined English team Worcester Warriors from the 2013–14 season. He was soon made club captain for Worcester Warriors for the 2013–14 season.

International career
Thomas played for Wales at Under 16, Youth, Under 19, Under 21 and Sevens level. He made his international debut against Australia in 2003. He became noticed by many during the 2003 Rugby World Cup in the match against New Zealand for his man of the match display.  He also played in the 2007 Rugby World Cup. Thomas was part of two Six Nations Grand Slams, in 2005, and in 2008 where he started every game.  Thomas was included in every Wales Six Nations squad between 2004 and 2011.  In his appearances for Wales he scored seven tries.

Coaching
Thomas joined Bristol Rugby ahead of the 2016/17 campaign as Defence and Forwards Coach.

He moved to former club Worcester Warriors ahead of the 2020–21 season. He left with immediate effect on 25 January 2022.

References

External links
Wales Profile

1982 births
Living people
Ospreys (rugby union) players
Rugby union flankers
Rugby union number eights
Rugby union players from Pembroke
Swansea RFC players
Wales international rugby union players
Welsh rugby union coaches
Welsh rugby union players
Worcester Warriors players